Siahuiyeh (also Romanized as Sīāhū’īyeh, Sīāhū’yeh, Sīāhūyeh, Sīyāhū’īyeh, and Seyāhūyeh; also known as Sīāhū) is a village in Fathabad Rural District, in the Central District of Khatam County, Yazd Province, Iran. At the 2006 census, its population was 23, in 4 families.

References 

Populated places in Khatam County